In six-dimensional geometry, a truncated 6-cube (or truncated hexeract) is a convex uniform 6-polytope, being a truncation of the regular 6-cube.

There are 5 truncations for the 6-cube. Vertices of the truncated 6-cube are located as pairs on the edge of the 6-cube. Vertices of the bitruncated 6-cube are located on the square faces of the 6-cube. Vertices of the tritruncated 6-cube are located inside the cubic cells of the 6-cube.

Truncated 6-cube

Alternate names
 Truncated hexeract (Acronym: tox) (Jonathan Bowers)

Construction and coordinates
A regular 5-simplex replaces each original vertex.

The Cartesian coordinates of the vertices of a truncated 6-cube having edge length 2 are the permutations of:

Images

Related polytopes 
The truncated 6-cube, is fifth in a sequence of truncated hypercubes:

Bitruncated 6-cube

Alternate names
 Bitruncated hexeract (Acronym: botox) (Jonathan Bowers)

Construction and coordinates
The Cartesian coordinates of the vertices of a bitruncated 6-cube having edge length 2 are the permutations of:

Images

Related polytopes 
The bitruncated 6-cube is fourth in a sequence of bitruncated hypercubes:

Tritruncated 6-cube

Alternate names
 Tritruncated hexeract (Acronym: xog) (Jonathan Bowers)

Construction and coordinates
The Cartesian coordinates of the vertices of a tritruncated 6-cube having edge length 2 are the permutations of:

Images

Related polytopes

Related polytopes

These polytopes are from a set of 63 Uniform 6-polytopes generated from the B6 Coxeter plane, including the regular 6-cube or 6-orthoplex.

Notes

References
 H.S.M. Coxeter: 
 H.S.M. Coxeter, Regular Polytopes, 3rd Edition, Dover New York, 1973 
 Kaleidoscopes: Selected Writings of H.S.M. Coxeter, edited by F. Arthur Sherk, Peter McMullen, Anthony C. Thompson, Asia Ivic Weiss, Wiley-Interscience Publication, 1995,  
 (Paper 22) H.S.M. Coxeter, Regular and Semi Regular Polytopes I, [Math. Zeit. 46 (1940) 380-407, MR 2,10]
 (Paper 23) H.S.M. Coxeter, Regular and Semi-Regular Polytopes II, [Math. Zeit. 188 (1985) 559-591]
 (Paper 24) H.S.M. Coxeter, Regular and Semi-Regular Polytopes III, [Math. Zeit. 200 (1988) 3-45]
 Norman Johnson Uniform Polytopes, Manuscript (1991)
 N.W. Johnson: The Theory of Uniform Polytopes and Honeycombs, Ph.D. 
  o3o3o3o3x4x - tox, o3o3o3x3x4o - botox, o3o3x3x3o4o - xog

External links 
 
 Polytopes of Various Dimensions
 Multi-dimensional Glossary

6-polytopes